These are the official results of the Women's Long Jump event at the 1999 World Championships in Seville, Spain. There were a total number of 36 participating athletes, with the final held on Monday 23 August 1999.

Medalists

Schedule
All times are Central European Time (UTC+1)

Abbreviations
All results shown are in metres

Qualification

Group A

Group B

Final

References
 IAAF
 todor66
 athletissimo
 trackandfieldnews

D
Long jump at the World Athletics Championships
1999 in women's athletics